Sir William Horace Montagu-Pollock  (12 July 1903 – 26 September 1993) was a British diplomat who was ambassador to Syria, Peru, Switzerland and Denmark.

Career
William Horace Montagu-Pollock was educated at Marlborough College and Trinity College, Cambridge.
He joined the Diplomatic Service in 1927 He served at Rome, Belgrade, Prague, Vienna and Stockholm, where he was chargé d'affaires during the Second World War. He then worked at the Foreign Office as the first Head of the Cultural Relations Department, for which he was appointed CMG in the King's Birthday Honours of 1946.

The CRD had its origins in a small Foreign Office section created to give political direction to the British Council and to manage the political and policy  aspects of the growing scale of organised international intellectual, cultural, societal and artistic contacts, with a view to promoting Allied goodwill; but it became, almost by accident, a small British front-line unit in a clandestine struggle to prevent Moscow's domination of the world of international movements, federations and assemblies – what would later be called ‘the battle of the festivals’. Later, Montagu-Pollock was head of the General Department of the Foreign Office.

In 1950, Montagu-Pollock was appointed Minister to Syria, upgraded to Ambassador in 1952.
In December 1953, he was appointed to be Ambassador to Peru ; While he was in Peru he was knighted KCMG in the Queen's Birthday Honours of 1957. In May 1958 he became Ambassador to Switzerland and in 1960 he became Ambassador to Denmark.

Sir William retired from the Diplomatic Service in 1962.

Personal life
In 1933, he married Prudence Williams, with whom he had one son and one daughter. They divorced in 1945, and Williams died in 1985. In 1948, he married Barbara Jowett. They had one son.

He was famous for "various idiosyncrasies" of cars and of personal dress, adapting "expertly to a local cuisine".

He was fond of "modern music", favoring the composer Elliott Carter and friends with Desmond Shawe-Taylor (music critic). He was Chairman of the British Institute of Recorded Sound from 1970–73, Vice-President of the Society for the Promotion of New Music and a member of the Board of Governors of the European Cultural Foundation.

References

Bibliography
MONTAGU-POLLOCK, Sir William Horace, Who Was Who, A & C Black, 1920–2008; online edn, Oxford University Press, Dec 2007, accessed 18 April 2012
Obituary: Sir William Montagu-Pollock, The Times, London, 18 October 1993

1903 births
1993 deaths
People educated at Marlborough College
Alumni of Trinity College, Cambridge
Ambassadors of the United Kingdom to Syria
Ambassadors of the United Kingdom to Peru
Ambassadors of the United Kingdom to Switzerland
Ambassadors of the United Kingdom to Denmark
Knights Commander of the Order of St Michael and St George